Peter Thorp Eckersley (2 July 1904 – 13 August 1940) was the captain of Lancashire County Cricket Club from 1929 to 1935, who retired for a career as a Conservative Party politician.

Early life 
Eckersley was born on 2 July 1904 to William Eckersley CBE and Eva Mary Eclersley (née Thorp) at Lowton in the north west of England. For his education he attended Rugby School, where he played for the first XI at cricket.

Cricket career

Lancashire 
He began playing cricket at Leigh Cricket Club before joining Lancashire County Cricket Club in 1923. Eckersley went up to Trinity College Cambridge but made his debut for Lancashire against his university on 9 May 1923. Over the course of his first-class cricket career he made 5,629 runs (his record score being 102), scoring 25 fifties, took 141 catches and took seven wickets for 348 runs conceded. His final first-class match took place on 31 August 1938 when he appeared for an England XI against a touring Australian team.

Exhibition matches and tours 
Eckersley was selected for the Marylebone Cricket Club (MCC) 1926/27 tour to India and Ceylon. He played 26 matches on the tour before returning to club cricket with Lancashire in April 1927. He also appeared for The Gentlemen against The Players, against Jamaica for L.H. Tennyson's XI and toured South America with Sir J. Cahn's XI.

Post-playing career

Business 
He worked in Stockport as a director at a coach building company called G.W. Smith and Co.

Politics 
Having unsuccessfully fought Leigh in 1931, he was elected at the 1935 general election as Member of Parliament (MP) for Manchester Exchange.

Aviation 
He and his wife, Audrey E. J. Eckersley, were members of the Lancashire Aero Club. He regularly flew himself to cricket matches, becoming known as the 'Flying Cricketer'.

Second World War 

Eckersley joined the Fleet Air Arm and was based at HMS Raven where he was in training. He died on 13 August 1940 in a flying accident near Eastleigh, Hampshire becoming the fourth MP to be killed in World War II. A stained glass window to his memory is in Chowbent Unitarian Chapel in Atherton.

He is buried at Tyldesley Cemetery in the care of the Commonwealth War Graves Commission.

References

External links
 Cricinfo profile
 Peter Eckersley at Cricket Archive (includes photo)
 Profile
 

1904 births
1940 deaths
Military personnel from Lancashire
People from Lowton
English cricketers
Lancashire cricketers
Lancashire cricket captains
Aviators killed in aviation accidents or incidents in England
Fleet Air Arm aviators
Royal Navy officers of World War II
Fleet Air Arm personnel of World War II
Royal Navy personnel killed in World War II
Conservative Party (UK) MPs for English constituencies
UK MPs 1935–1945
Marylebone Cricket Club cricketers
Gentlemen cricketers
British sportsperson-politicians
English cricketers of 1919 to 1945
L. H. Tennyson's XI cricket team
Victims of aviation accidents or incidents in 1940
People educated at Rugby School